Giorgos Savvidis (born February 8, 1961) is a former international Cypriot football attacking midfielder 
and football manager. During his playing days, he was regarded one of the best players in the country and was voted in the best 11 Cypriot national players of the past century.

Club career
Savvidis took his first football steps in Olympiakos Nicosia and then had a long career at Omonia. After dominating Cypriot football, AEK Athens signed him in 1987 for 40 million drachmas. There he soon captured the imagination of the fans winning instant recognition. He was appointed captain of the team in 1988 and lifted the 1988–89 league, while also winning another championship in 1991–92. The following season Savvidis returned to Cyprus and Omonia helping them win their 17th league title in the Cypriot championship. Three years later he retired having achieved fame and recognition by the Omonia fan base.

Managerial career
He began his training career at Digenis Akritas Morphou winning the B league of Cyprus and achieved promotion for the club after almost 30 years. He left after a while to pursue a career along long-time friend Toni Savevski as his assistant manager. In the season 2001–02 he was the assistant coach for Apollon Limassol and between 2002–2004 assistant coach of Omonia Nicosia. In 2003, he won the Cypriot championship and the Cyprus Super Cup with Omonia. After the end of the 2004 season Savevski was sacked, causing Savvidis to leave as well. Savvidis agreed to return to Omonia after Dragan Okuka was sacked after failing to improve Omonia's fortunes. Omonia's fans were keen to see what effect this change was going to bring in the club's bewildering fortunes and had hoped that one of the club's long-time servants had what it takes to lift them to the top once again. However, Savvidis failed to change the club's performances and after only four months on the job quit, citing pressure from the Omonia fans.

Honours

As a player

Club

Omonia (12)
 Cypriot First Division (7): 1980–81, 1981–82, 1982–83, 1983–84, 1984–85, 1986–87, 1992–93
 Cypriot Cup (3): 1981–82, 1982–83, 1993–94
 Cyprus FA Shield (2): 1982, 1983

AEK Athens (5)
Alpha Ethniki (2): 1988–89, 1991–92
Greek League Cup (1): 1989–90
Pre-Mediterranean Cup (1): 1991
Greek Super Cup (1): 1989

As a manager

Club

Digenis Morphou (1)
Cypriot Second Division (1): 1999–2000

Individual

 Cypriot Championship Top scorer (1): 1985

References

External links

1961 births
Living people
Cypriot footballers
Cyprus international footballers
Cypriot football managers
Cypriot First Division players
AC Omonia players
AC Omonia managers
AEK Athens F.C. players
Super League Greece players
Expatriate footballers in Greece
Cypriot expatriate footballers
Cypriot expatriate sportspeople in Greece
Sportspeople from Nicosia
Association football midfielders
Digenis Akritas Morphou FC managers